The 2017 Kunal Patel San Francisco Open was a professional tennis tournament played on indoor hard courts. It was the first edition of the tournament and was a part of the 2017 ATP Challenger Tour. It took place in San Francisco, United States from February 6–12, 2017.

Singles main-draw entrants

Seeds

 1 Rankings are as of January 30, 2017.

Other entrants
The following players received wildcards into the singles main draw:
  Marcos Giron
  Bradley Klahn
  Ramkumar Ramanathan
  Ryan Shane

The following players received entry from the qualifying draw:
  Eric Quigley
  Raymond Sarmiento
  Brayden Schnur
  Zhang Ze

Champions

Singles

  Zhang Ze def.  Vasek Pospisil 7–5, 3–6, 6–2.

Doubles

 Matt Reid /  John-Patrick Smith def.  Gong Maoxin /  Zhang Ze 6–7(4–7), 7–5, [10–7].

External links
 Official website

Kunal Patel San Francisco Open
Sports competitions in San Francisco
2017 in sports in California
Kunai